Elizabeth Clara Müller (married name Gonçalves; 6 March 1926 – 12 July 2010) was a Brazilian high jumper, sprinter and shot putter.

At the 1948 Summer Olympics, she placed 17th in the high jump. In the 100 metres and the shot put she was eliminated in the first round. At the 1951 Pan American Games she won a bronze medal in the high jump.

She was highly successful at the South American Championships in Athletics, winning one 200 metres title, two high jump titles and two shot put titles. In total she won 10 medals over her career at the championship, including a long jump silver medal in 1945.

She died in Abelardo Luz.

References

External links
 

1926 births
2010 deaths
Brazilian female high jumpers
Brazilian female sprinters
Brazilian female shot putters
Olympic athletes of Brazil
Athletes (track and field) at the 1948 Summer Olympics
Pan American Games bronze medalists for Brazil
Athletes (track and field) at the 1951 Pan American Games
Athletes (track and field) at the 1955 Pan American Games
Pan American Games medalists in athletics (track and field)
Medalists at the 1951 Pan American Games
21st-century Brazilian women
20th-century Brazilian women